Bordj El Houasse (also written Bordj El Haouasse or Bordj El Haouès) is a town and commune in Djanet District, Djanet Province, Algeria. It is part of Djanet District. According to the 2008 census it has a population of 2,963, up from 2,185 in 1998, and an annual population growth rate of 3.2%. Its municipal code is 3305.

Geography

An intermittent river (wadi) passes by the town to the southwest, flowing from northwest to southeast out of the mountains.

Climate

Bordj El Houasse has a hot desert climate (Köppen climate classification BWh), with very hot summers and mild winters, and very little precipitation throughout the year.

Transportation

The town of Bordj El Houasse lies at the intersection between the N3 highway (to Illizi in the north and Djanet to the east) and the N55 highway to the south (to Idlès and, via the N1, Tamanrasset). A local road also leads west to the village of Tabakat to the west. The nearest airport is Djanet Inedbirene Airport.

Education

2.2% of the population has a tertiary education (the lowest rate in the province), and another 7.7% has completed secondary education. The overall literacy rate is 60.9%, and is 77.6% among males and 40.5% among females; all three rates are the lowest in the province.

Localities
The commune is composed of two localities:
Bordj El Houasse
Iherir

References

Neighbouring towns and cities

Djanet District
Tuareg
Communes of Illizi Province